Lessons in Love may refer to:

Music
 "Lessons in Love" (Jeri Lynne Fraser song), 1961; covered by Cliff Richard and the Shadows and the Allisons
"Lessons in Love" (Level 42 song), 1986
 Lessons in Love (album), a 2008 album by Lloyd
 "Lessons in Love (All Day, All Night)", a song by Neon Trees featuring Kaskade from the album Picture Show (2012)

Film
 Lessons in Love (1921 film), an American film directed by Chester Withey starring Constance Talmadge
 Some Kind of Beautiful (UK title: Lessons in Love), a 2014 American film
 A Lesson in Love, a 1954 Swedish comedy film
 A Lesson in Love (1931 film), an American comedy film